The Los Angeles County Fire Department (LACoFD) provides firefighting and emergency medical services for the unincorporated parts of Los Angeles County, California, as well as 59 cities through contracting, including the city of La Habra which is located in Orange County and is the first city outside of Los Angeles County to contract with LACoFD.

The department is commanded by Chief Anthony C. Marrone and has an annual budget of $1.4 Billion. According to Firehouse magazine, the LACoFD is the fourth busiest department in the United States, behind New York City Fire Department, Chicago Fire Department, and Los Angeles City Fire Department. The department responded to 394,585 calls for service in 2017. The LACoFD has been featured several times in popular culture, including the 1970s NBC TV series Emergency! and the 1950s TV series Rescue 8.

In 2020, the department responded to 307,025 emergency medical responses and a total of 379,517 total responses.

History

In 1949, the Consolidated Fire Protection District was established by the Board of Supervisors 
through the consolidation of numerous fire districts which existed since the 1920s. From 1967 to 
1986, there existed four fire protection districts within the Los Angeles County, all of which were 
governed by the Board of Supervisors: the Consolidated Fire Protection District (CFPD), Universal 
Fire Protection District, Dominguez Fire Protection District, and Wrightwood Fire Protection 
District. In addition, there was the Forester and Fire Warden (F&FW) which is a chartered office 
of the County and was funded by the General Fund. The property tax rate for each district was 
considerably different.
With the property tax limitations and standardization of tax rates established by Proposition 13 in 
1978, there was no longer a need to maintain the separate districts. From 1986 to 1992, the F&FW 
and the CFPD were the two remaining legal entities that made up what is commonly known as the 
Los Angeles County Fire Department. In 1992, the CFPD annexed all the remaining unincorporated 
area in with a corresponding property tax transfer to fulfill the chartered responsibilities of the 
F&FW. 
The Los Angeles County Fire Department has a very rich and unique history, which is full of 
innovation, and daring accomplishments. From designing the 9-1-1 system and initiating a 
paramedic program in the 1970's to the current day Urban Search and Rescue and Homeland 
Security Sections, our Fire Department is a leader and model to fire departments around the 
world. Our Department's ability to develop new techniques and tactics to fight fires of all kinds 
has benefited not only the residents we serve, but the fire service in general, both nationally and 
internationally.

Emergency operations
The Emergency Operations Bureau includes the Training and EMS Bureau (TEMSB), nine major firefighting divisions, Air and Wildland Division, and Homeland Security Section. The Fire Department's service area includes suburban neighborhoods, city centers, commercial district, sandy beaches, mountain ranges, and more. The region's varying terrain causes unique emergency incident challenges, including increased EMS calls and variety of fires that can take place on a single day (i.e., wildland, structure, railroad, aircraft, vehicle, etc.) as well as ocean rescues and medical calls across 72 miles of coastline.

Fire suppression camps

The LACoFD has 10 fire camps with handcrews which are used for both fire prevention and wildland firefighting. In 2013, to help combat jail crowding as well as increase time served by serious criminal offenders, Los Angeles County sent more than 500 inmates to firefighting camps in mountain and foothill areas. Inmates assigned to the camps are nonviolent offenders who have completed physical and security screenings. They are trained by county firefighters to help fight fires and assist with clearing brush and debris. The camps are run in conjunction with the California Department of Corrections and Rehabilitation and the Los Angeles County Probation Department.

Rank structure

 Firefighter Trainee (FFT)
 Firefighter (Emergency Medical Technician) (FF) (EMT)
 Firefighter (Paramedic) (FF/PM or FP)
 Firefighter Specialist/Engineer (FFS)
 Fire Captain (CA)
 Battalion Chief (Battalion Commander) (BC)
 Assistant Chief (Division Commander) (AC)
 Deputy Chief (Bureau Commander) (DC)
 Chief Deputy (CD)
 Fire Chief (FC)

Apparatus 
The Los Angeles County Fire Department utilizes a wide array of firefighting apparatus, including engines, quints, trucks, light forces (engine + quint or truck), patrol units, and water tenders. Support apparatus include rescue squads, hazardous materials squads, and urban search and rescue squads. LACoFD apparatus are painted reddish-orange as opposed to LAFD apparatus, which are fire engine red.

Tiller trucks
While many modern fire departments have opted to go with trucks/quints that have rear-mounted ladders, the LACoFD has chosen to stay with tiller trucks because of their enhanced maneuverability in tight areas. The benefit of a quint is that it also has a built in pump and water tank and can thus operate without an engine. The Tiller trucks carry fire suppression tools and medical equipment as well as specialized rescue equipment for responses to a variety of emergencies.

Helicopters

The LA County Fire Department has 10 helicopters available for aerial firefighting.  The headquarters for the Air Operations Section is located at Barton Heliport, next to Whiteman Airport in Pacoima.
 Five Sikorsky S-70A/S-70i Firehawks Copter 15, Copter 16, Copter 19, Copter 21, and Copter 22 are fitted with  tanks.
 One Bell 412 Copter 12 is fitted with a  tank.
 Two Bell 412EP Copter 11 and Copter 14 are outfitted with  tanks.
 Two Bell 412HP Copter 17 and Copter 18 are outfitted with  tanks.

Stations and apparatus 

.

Some Stations have 2 engines. Engines with a 4+station number are cross-staffed Type 3 wildland engines. Units marked “paramedic/Advanced Life Support” are full medic units (two paramedics on board). Units marked “PAU” are paramedic assessment units (one paramedic on board).

Communications Center 

The LACoFD is currently dispatched from the P. Michael Freeman Command And Control Facility at the county fire operations center in East Los Angeles. (Location: 34.0526454N, 118.1724628W)

In popular culture

The Los Angeles County Fire Department has been featured in multiple different television series.
 Rescue 8 – The syndicated series of the late 1950s focused on Rescue Squad 8 and starred Jim Davis and Lang Jeffries.
 Emergency! –  The NBC series of the 1970s dramatized a department paramedic rescue squad, popularly credited for encouraging the widespread adaptation of paramedics. The exterior fire station scenes for the fictional station 51 in the series were shot at county fire station 127. It is now called the Robert A. Cinader Memorial Fire Station in honor of the television producer who made the station famous. In addition, the fire station on the Universal Pictures lot in Universal City, where the series was produced, was initially designated Station 60 during the production of the series, and is now designated Station 51.
 Baywatch – The NBC series starring David Hasselhoff focused on the Los Angeles County Lifeguards, a division of the Los Angeles County Fire Department, who patrol the beaches of Los Angeles. Baywatch Nights and the 2017 Baywatch film also include the Los Angeles county Fire service.
Grand Theft Auto V – Los Santos County Fire Department is based on the LACoFD.

 Volcano, 1997 movie featuring Tommy Lee Jones.

See also

 Heninger Flats
 Los Angeles County Lifeguards – division of the LACoFD focused on patrolling the beaches of Los Angeles County
 PulsePoint – Application used by the LACoFD
 The Stentorians

Notes

References

External links

Los Angeles County Fire Department
County of Los Angeles Fire Museum Association
Los Angeles County Firefighters Local 1014

Fire departments in California
Fire Department
Organizations based in Los Angeles County, California
County government agencies in California
Government agencies established in 1920
1920 establishments in California